

Mondsee is a town in the Vöcklabruck district in the Austrian state of Upper Austria located on the shore of the lake Mondsee. The town is home to the medieval Mondsee Abbey, whose cloister church was used for the site of the wedding in The Sound of Music.

The town is also known for the SKGLB railway museum and for prehistoric pile-dwelling (or stilt house) settlements at Mondsee, which are part of UNESCO World Heritage Sites.

One of its past sons is Alexander Strähuber (1814–1882), the history painter and book illustrator, and from 1865 to 1882 professor at the Munich Royal Academy of Fine Arts.

Population

Neighbouring municipalities 
 Unterach am Attersee
 Tiefgraben
 Innerschwand
 Sankt Lorenz

Gallery

See also
 Mondseer cheese

References

External links 
 Tourist Information of Mondsee and area 
 Mondseeland 
  
 DORIS-Map 
 Platform for the touristic theme and culture in Mondsee 

Cities and towns in Vöcklabruck District